Coginchaug Regional High School (abbreviated as C.R.H.S.) is a public high school located in Durham, Connecticut and is named after the Coginchaug River. It is part of Regional School District #13, which encompasses the communities of Durham, Middlefield and Rockfall, Connecticut. Coginchaug is attended by students in grades 9 through 12.

Principal
The principal of Coginchaug Regional High School is Debra Stone as of the 2022–2023 school year.

Academics
A variety of academic programs and coursework are offered at Coginchaug, including special education, standard high school classes at three levels (Honors, College Prep A, and College Prep B), and Advanced Placement classes.

Extracurricular

Newspaper
The student newspaper is The Devil's Advocate, which is published on a biweekly basis as part of The Town Times, the local newspaper of Durham and Middlefield.

Sports
Coginchaug offers a wide range of sports and extracurricular activities, including; cross country, indoor and outdoor track, basketball, soccer, football (co-op with East Hampton and Hale-Ray), volleyball, golf, tennis, baseball, softball, ice hockey (boys co-op with Haddam-Killingworth Regional and Lyman Hall in Wallingford; plays home games at Northford Ice Pavilion), swimming and diving (co-op with Lyman Hall, meets held at Sheehan HS in Wallingford), and also offers a Unified Sports program

The school's mascot is the Blue Devil, and the school's colors are blue and white.

The football team was co-winner of the Pequot-Sassacus League in the 2009-2010 season, along with Hyde and Cromwell.

The girls' basketball team won the Class S championship in the 2011-2012 season and the 2017-2018 season.

The softball team won the Class S championship in 1983, 1994, 1995, 1997, 1998, 1999, 2002, 2005, 2006, 2008, 2012 and most recently in 2021.

The boys' outdoor track team has a very decorated record, which includes Shoreline Championships in 1995-2002, 2007, 2010, 2017, and 2018. They have consistently placed second or third in the years that they have not won the championship.

References

External links
 

Durham, Connecticut
Middlefield, Connecticut
Schools in Middlesex County, Connecticut
Public high schools in Connecticut